Tomorrow is the eighth studio album by rapper C-Murder. The album was released on June 15, 2010 under TRU Records & Venti Uno, while he is serving life imprisonment sentence for second degree murder.

Track listing
"The Message" — 1:46
"The Life Eye Live" (featuring Verse & AR) — 5:10
"Snow Bunny" (featuring Verse & Jason Lyric) — 4:02
"Tomorrow" (featuring B-Streezy) — 4:43
"Message Parlor" (Skit) — 1:59
"Bottom of da Boot" (featuring Verse & Dofus) — 4:02
"Heartbeat" (featuring Verse) — 3:44
"See It in My Eyes" (featuring Von, Holidae & AR) — 4:28
"Neva Look Back" — 3:45
"How I Live" (featuring Verse) — 4:48
"Chinese Restaurant" (Skit) — 0:54
"I'm a Problem" (featuring Pukie, Von & Jahbo) — 4:05
"Suicide Mission" (featuring Macho & Kis) — 4:38
"Make U Cry" — 3:07
"Thank You" — 0:38

Credits

References

C-Murder albums
2010 albums